"Je crois toi" (meaning "I Believe You") is the fifth and last single from Celine Dion's album, S'il suffisait d'aimer (1998). It was a radio only release in France on 5 July 1999. "Je crois toi" was written and produced by Jean-Jacques Goldman.

Background and release
No music video was made for the song.

At the same time there was another radio single issued in France—"En attendant ses pas".

"Je crois toi" was a B-side to the "I'm Your Angel" single in the United Kingdom.

A live version of this song was included on the Au cœur du stade CD and DVD. The latter also contained as a bonus the recording of "Je crois toi". Another live version is included in the Céline une seule fois / Live 2013 CD/DVD.

Dion performed this song live during her Summer Tour 2016.

Formats and track listings
Promotional CD single
"Je crois toi" – 5:05

References

Celine Dion songs
1999 singles
French-language songs
Songs written by Jean-Jacques Goldman
1998 songs
Epic Records singles